Eurystomella is a genus of bryozoans belonging to the family Eurystomellidae.

The species of this genus are found in New Zealand Western North America.

Species:

Eurystomella aupouria 
Eurystomella biperforata 
Eurystomella foraminigera

References

Bryozoan genera